Barisan of Ibelin (died 1150) was an important figure in the crusader Kingdom of Jerusalem, and was the founder of the Ibelin family. His name was later written as "Balian" and he is sometimes known as Balian the Elder, Barisan the Old or Balian I.  Barisan was lord of Ramla from 1138 to 1150.

Barisan's origins are obscure. The Ibelins later claimed to be descended from the viscounts of Chartres, but according to Peter W. Edbury, Barisan was probably from northern Italy. According to Jonathan Riley-Smith, however, he may have indeed been connected to Chartres, as the brother of Hugh of Le Puiset, Count of Jaffa; he would then have also been a cousin to the Montlhéry family of King Baldwin II of Jerusalem.

However, nothing certain is known of his life before 1115, when he appears as constable of Jaffa under Hugh. In 1120 he was present at the Council of Nablus, where the first laws of the kingdom were promulgated, perhaps representing the new, underaged Count of Jaffa, Hugh II. Around the same year, his services were rewarded with a marriage to Helvis of Ramla, daughter of Baldwin I of Ramla. In 1134, when Hugh II rebelled against King Fulk, Barisan supported the king, and soon became prominent at Fulk's court. In 1141, perhaps as a reward for his loyalty in 1134, he was granted the newly constructed castle of Ibelin, located in the County of Jaffa between Jaffa itself and the Fatimid Egyptian fortress of Ascalon. It was from this castle that the family took their name.

In 1148 Barisan inherited the nearby lordship of Ramla, through his wife Helvis. That year, Barisan was also present at the council convened at Acre after the arrival of the Second Crusade, at which it was decided to attack Damascus. Barisan died in 1150 and Ibelin was inherited by Hugh. Helvis then married Manasses of Hierges, Constable of Jerusalem.

With Helvis lady of Ramla (daughter of Baldwin I of Ramla), Barisan was the father of:
 Hugh of Ibelin, Lord of Ramla
 Baldwin of Ibelin, Lord of Mirabel and Ramla
 Barisan the Younger (known as Balian), Lord of Nablus
 Ermengarde of Ibelin, Lady of Tiberias, married William I of Bures
 Stephanie of Ibelin (d. after 1167)

Sources
William of Tyre, A History of Deeds Done Beyond the Sea, trans. E. A. Babcock and A. C. Krey. Columbia University Press, 1943.
Peter W. Edbury, John of Ibelin and the Kingdom of Jerusalem. Boydell Press, 1997.
Jonathan Riley-Smith, The First Crusaders, 1095-1131. Cambridge University Press, 1997, as Barisan the Old.

References

1150 deaths
Christians of the Crusades
House of Ibelin
Year of birth unknown
Lords of Ramla